The following is a summary of Down county football team's 2023 season, which was its 120th year. On 9 August 2022, Conor Laverty was appointed Down manager.

Competitions

Dr McKenna Cup

The McKenna Cup group draw took place on 15 December 2021.

Table

Fixtures

National Football League Division 3

Down will compete in Division Three of the National League in 2023. The GAA released the fixtures for the league season on 8 December 2022.

Fixtures

Table

Reports

Ulster Senior Football Championship

The draw for the 2023 Ulster Championship was made on 15 October 2022.

Fixtures

Bracket

All-Ireland Senior Football Championship

The 2023 All Ireland Senior Football Championship draw will take place following the conclusion of Down's participation in the Ulster Championship.

References

Down
Gaelic
Down county football team seasons